Aunrihar Junction is a railway station located in the city of Aunrihar in the Indian state of Uttar Pradesh. It is an important railway station in Ghazipur district. It falls on Varanasi–Chhapra line and Aunrihar–Jaunpur line. It is well connected to major cities including New Delhi, Mumbai, Surat, Ahmedabad, Kolkata, Pune, Faizabad, Ayodhya, Lucknow, Kanpur, Allahabad, Jaunpur and Varanasi.

Aunrihar DMU Shed 
Union Minister of State for Railways Manoj Sinha handed over two schemes worth Rs 153 crore to his parliamentary constituency Ghazipur. He inaugurated the DEMU shed on Aunrihar Junction.

Saidpur E-Loco-Shed 
Saidpur Bhitri E-loco Shed is 6 km from Aunrihar Junction and 0.5 km from Saidpur Bhitri railway station (SYH).
Minister of State for Railways and Minister of State (Independent charge) Manoj Sinha said that after the formation of AC Electric Locoshed, the name of the Sardar Bhitri, known for the article of Emperor Skanda Gupta, will become immortal in Indian Railways. The Minister of State for Railways was speaking at the foundation stone laying ceremony of AC Locoshed of 100 Loco capacity at Saidpur Bhitari railway station located on Saturday. Said that 100 locos will be maintained here in the initial phase. Later it will be made of 200 people capacity.

References 

 

Railway junction stations in Uttar Pradesh
Railway stations in Ghazipur district
Varanasi railway division